Jörgen Ohlin (19 December 1937 – 21 March 2013) was a Swedish footballer who played as a defender.

References

Association football defenders
Swedish footballers
Allsvenskan players
Malmö FF players
1937 births
2013 deaths